Paul H. Wyatt (February 27, 1907 – December 15, 1970) was an American competition swimmer and two-time Olympic medalist.  Wyatt represented the United States at the 1924 Summer Olympics and 1928 Summer Olympics.

He was born in southwestern Pennsylvania in the small coal-mining community of Brier Hill, Pennsylvania.

In the 1924 Paris Olympics, he won a silver medal in the men's 100-meter backstroke event.  Four years later, in the 1928 Amsterdam Olympics, he won a bronze medal in the 100-meter backstroke for his third-place finish in the event.

Wyatt's middle name was "Knuth", which was his wife's maiden name. When he was married to then Juanita Knuth, he did not have a middle name. He took his wife's maiden name as his middle name. He also became a radiographer working in Nevada. His job led to his death of lymphoma.

See also
 List of Olympic medalists in swimming (men)

References

External links
  Paul Wyatt – Olympic athlete profile at Sports-Reference.com

1907 births
1970 deaths
American male backstroke swimmers
Olympic bronze medalists for the United States in swimming
Olympic silver medalists for the United States in swimming
Swimmers at the 1924 Summer Olympics
Swimmers at the 1928 Summer Olympics
Medalists at the 1928 Summer Olympics
Medalists at the 1924 Summer Olympics
20th-century American people